Cha Yu-ram (born July 23, 1987) is a South Korean professional pool player.

History 
She started playing tennis in 1995 when she was a freshman in elementary school. In September 2006, she began to announce her name with the opportunity to have a friendly game against the world billiard star Jeanette Lee. Since then, she has been a national player in the 2006 Doha Asian Games and the 2010 Guangzhou Asian Games. She won gold for nine-ball singles in the 2009 Asian Indoor Games. She signed a management agreement with IB Sports in March 2010. She signed an agreement with Icarus Sports, a sports professional agency, in 2013 when the contract with IB Sports was terminated. She married Lee Ji Sung on June 20, 2015. On November 10, 2015, she released her daughter on the 9th through the media and announced that she plans to concentrate on childcare without any broadcasting activities for the time being, with both mothers and children healthy.

Career 

 2003: 1st place in Korean women's pocket 9 ball ranking
 2004: pulsalang 9 Ball Open 1st place
 2005: 1st place in Korean women's three-cushion competition
 2005: 2nd place in KBF national pocket 9 ball championship
 2006 : KBF Pocket 9 Ball National Tour Rankings Second in Game 1
 2008: US Open semifinal
 2008: Second place in the XTM Billiard Championship
 2009: Hong Kong East Asian Games Cue Sports 6 Red Snooker bronze medal
 2009: 1st place in the 9th Asian Asian Games Pocket 2009
 2010: 2010 Amway Cup World Women's Open 9 Ball Open
 2010: ChunCheon World Leisure Games Billiards Ambre Cup Pocket 9 Ball, Women's Billiards Second Run
 2010: The 91st National Sports Festival Billiards Women's General Pocket 9-Ball Gold Medal (Demonstration Event)
 2011: 1st place in the world 9-ball Beijing Open
 2011: 1st place in the nation's pocket 9 ball open competition
 2011: The 2nd Korean Billiards Federation President's Cup 10-ball runners-up
 2012: The 3rd Korean Billiards Federation President's Cup  10-ball 1st place
 2012: 3rd place Busan mayor's cup 10-ball 1st place
 2012: 1st place in the 4th Pocket M-Tour Tournament
 2012: 3rd place in world women's 10-ball championship
 2012: The 93rd National Athletic Meet Billiards Women's General Pocket 9 Ball bronze medal
 2012: The 8th Korea Sports Council 10-ball 3rd place
 2013: 2nd place in 2013 pocket M-Tour 1st round
 2013: The 9th Korea Sports Council 9-ball 2nd place
 2013: The 4th Korean Billiards Federation President 9-ball 2nd place
 2013: 2013 Indoor Asian Games 10-Ball Gold
 2013: 2013 Indoor Asian Games 9-Ball Gold
 2013: Suwon Cup national pocket billiard competition 9 ball first place
 2013: 2013 CBSA Beijing Mewin 9-Ball Open 1st place
 2013: The 94th National Sports Festival 10-Ball Gold Medal
 2014: 2014 CBSA Guangzhou International No. 9 Open 2nd place

References

1987 births
Living people
South Korean pool players
Female pool players
Cue sports players at the 2010 Asian Games
Cue sports players at the 2006 Asian Games
Asian Games competitors for South Korea